A minor seminary or high school seminary is a secondary day or boarding school created for the specific purpose of enrolling teenage boys who have expressed interest in becoming Catholic priests. They are generally Catholic institutions, and designed to prepare boys both academically and spiritually for vocations to the priesthood and religious life. They emerged in cultures and societies where literacy was not universal, and the minor seminary was seen as a means to prepare younger boys in literacy for later entry into the major seminary.

The minor seminary is no longer very familiar in the developed world. The 1917 Code of Canon Law described the purpose of minor seminaries as: "to take care especially to protect from the contagion of the world, to train in piety, to imbue with the rudiments of literary studies, and to foster in them the seed of a divine vocation". Suitable boys were encouraged to graduate to a major seminary, where they would continue their tertiary studies for the priesthood.

The program of priestly formation of the USCCB refers to them as "high school seminaries" rather than minor seminaries.

Today, college seminaries, where philosophy is studied, are often called minor seminaries even though they are for those who have completed high school.

Currently Operating Minor Seminaries

Canada
Seminary of Christ the King, (Mission, British Columbia)

East Timor
 Seminary of Our Lady of Fatima – minor seminary, located in Dare
 Seminary of SS Peter and Paul – major seminary, located in Fatumeta
 Good Shepherd Minor Seminary, Pala, India
 St Paul's Minor Seminary, Akalpur, Jammu

Ghana
 St Teresa's Minor Seminary

India
St.Joseph Minor Seminary, Kalamassery – Minor Seminary for the Archdiocese of Verapoly, Kerala.
 St. Aloysius Seminary, Trivandrum – minor seminary for the Syro-Malankara Archeparchy of Trivandrum
 St. Agnes Minor Seminary, Cuddalore, Tamil Nadu

Indonesia
 Minor seminary of Saint Paul Palembang
 Peter Canisius Minor Seminary Mertoyudan
 Wacana Bhakti Minor Seminary

Pakistan
 St. Mary's Minor Seminary, Lahore
 Our Lady of Lourdes Minor Seminary, Islamabad–Rawalpindi, founded in 1995
 St. Pius X Minor Seminary – Karachi, founded in 1958
 St. Thomas the Apostle Minor Seminary, Faisalabad, founded in 1981

Philippines
 St. Augustine Minor Seminary-Minor Seminary of Iba, Zambales, Luzon covering Olongapo City and Zambales Province 
 San Jacinto Seminary (Penablanca, Cagayan) –Minor Seminary of the Archdiocese of Tuguegarao
 Diocesan Seminary of the Heart of Jesus (San Fernando La Union) –minor seminary
 Immaculate Conception Minor Seminary (Vigan, Ilocos Sur)
 St. Mary's Seminary (Laoag, Ilocos Norte) - minor seminary
 Immaculate Conception Minor Seminary (Guiguinto, Bulacan) – Minor seminary of the Diocese of Malolos
 John Paul II Minor Seminary (Antipolo, Rizal) – high school seminary of the Diocese of Antipolo
 Oblates of St. Joseph Minor Seminary (San Jose, Batangas) – high school seminary
 Our Lady of Guadalupe Minor Seminary (Makati) – high school seminary of the Archdiocese of Manila
 Our Lady of Mount Carmel Seminary (Sariaya, Quezon) - Minor Seminary, Diocese of Lucena
 Pope John XXIII Seminary (Cebu City), Minor Seminary of the Archdiocese of Cebu
 Pope Paul VI Minor Seminary (Maasin City, Southern Leyte)
 Saint Francis de Sales Minor Seminary (Lipa City, Batangas) - Minor(High School) Seminary of the Archdiocese of Lipa
 Holy Rosary Minor Seminary (Naga City, Camarines Sur) Archdiocese of Caceres
 St. Gregory the Great Seminary (Panal, Tabaco City); Celebrating 50 years in Panal 2–3 September 2010. Minor Seminary for the Diocese of Legazpi
 Our Lady of Peñafrancia Seminary Sorsogon City), Diocese of Sorsogon
 St. Anthony High School Seminary (Kinamaligan, Masbate City) (Will celebrate 50 years of foundation in 2021) Under the supervision of the Diocese of Masbate
 Sto. Nino Seminary (Numancia, Aklan) - minor and college
 St. Pius X Seminary (Lawaan, Roxas City, Capiz) - minor seminary of the Archdiocese of Capiz
 Saint Vincent Ferrer Seminary - (Jaro, Iloilo City) - Minor Seminary of the Archdiocese of Jaro
 Seminario de San Jose (Puerto Princesa City, Palawan) - minor and major seminary

Poland
 Minor Seminary of the Archdiocese of Częstochowa - high school seminary of the Archdiocese of Częstochowa
 Minor Seminary of the Diocese of Płock - minor seminary of the Diocese of Płock

United States
The following minor seminaries operate in the USA today.
 Blessed Jose Sanchez del Rio Minor Seminary (Mankato, Minnesota), high school seminary run by the Institute of the Incarnate Word; opened in 2008.
 Sacred Heart Apostolic School (Rolling Prairie, Indiana) run by the Legionaries of Christ, opened in 2005
 St. Lawrence High School Seminary (Mount Calvary, Wisconsin) run by the Capuchin Friars, opened in 1860
St. Joseph Seminary (Rathdrum, Idaho) (Sedevacantist) 
 Servants of the Holy Family (Colorado Springs, Colorado)
St. Joseph House of Formation (Under Construction) (Wichita, Kansas) Wichita Diocese

Uganda
Bukalasa Minor Seminary
Christ the King Seminary, Kisubi, 
St. Joseph's Seminary, Nyenga – minor seminary
Mubende Seminary – in Nandele and Nyenga; minor seminary
Nadiket seminary – for the dioceses of Kotido and Moroto
Saint Charles seminary – minor seminary
Saints Joseph's and Gabriel's Junior Seminary Nswanjere – located in Nswanjere, Mpigi District.
St. Pius X Seminary – Nagongera – Located in Tororo district; West Budama County; Junior and Minor Seminary
St. Paul's Seminary – Rushoroza – in Kabale for Kabale Diocese; minor seminary
 Kitabi Seminary in Bushenyi for Mbarara Arch diocese; minor seminary
 Sacred Heart Mission for the Brothers of Divine Mercy; Missionary preparation
 Sacred Heart Seminary Lacor – Gulu archdiocese
 St Peter's Seminary-Madera) – in Soroti for Soroti Diocese; minor seminary

Vietnam
Sacred Heart Seminary of Thai Binh – Minor Seminary of the Diocese of Thái Bình
Saint Nicolas Seminary of Phan Thiet – Minor Seminary of the Diocese of Phan Thiết

External links
Code of Canon Law (1983), IntraText edition with referenced concordance, hosted by the Vatican
Catholic Encyclopedia: Canon Law
Congregation of Mary Immaculate Queen (sedevacantist)
Blessed Jose Sanchez del Rio Minor Seminary
Sacred Heart Apostolic School

References

School types